"Cold Women & Warm Beer" is a CD single by The Black League, released in 2003 by Spinefarm Records' sub label Ranch.

Track listing
"Cold Women & Warm Beer" (Luttinen, Jarva et al.)
"Hot Wheels" (Aaltonen, Häkkinen, Stanley)
"Harm-A-Get-On-Go-Go" (Luttinen, Jarva et al.)

All lyrics by Taneli Jarva except track 2.

Personnel
Taneli Jarva — Vocals
Sir Luttinen — Drums
Maike Valanne — Guitar
Alexi Ranta — Guitar
Mikko Laurila — Bass guitar
Ultra Bimboos (Milla, Maria & Suffeli) - Backing vocals (tracks 1,3)
Don Martinez & "the man" - After party appearance (track 2)

2003 singles